The discography of British rapper Professor Green consists of three studio albums, two extended plays, twelve singles and fifteen music videos.

Professor Green released his first extended play, The Green EP, in November 2008 independently. The first single, "I Need You Tonight", debuted at number three on the UK Singles Chart and number fifteen in Ireland in April 2010. The EP's second single, the Lily Allen collaboration, "Just Be Good to Green", reached number five in the UK, number seventeen in Ireland and also charting in Australia and New Zealand. His studio album, Alive Till I'm Dead (sic) was released in July 2010 in the United Kingdom and it debuted at number two and was certified as Gold by the British Phonographic Industry (BPI). The album also contained the singles, "Monster", featuring Example, and "Jungle" featuring Maverick Sabre, which peaked at number twenty-nine and thirty-one in the UK respectively.

The rapper's second studio album, At Your Inconvenience was released in October 2011; where it debuted at number three on the UK chart. It was preceded by the release of "Read All About It", which—featuring Emeli Sandé—went on to become the artist's first number-one single. The track also marked Green's first international certification award, with the Australian Recording Industry Association certifying it as platinum. A further three singles were released from the album throughout 2012: "Never Be a Right Time", "Remedy"—featuring Ruth-Anne— and "Avalon"—featuring Sierra Kusterbeck— peaking at number thirty-five, number eighteen and number twenty-nine in the United Kingdom respectively.

Growing Up in Public will be released as Green's third studio album on 22 September 2014.

Professor Green has also appeared as a featured artist on several occasions, including on Tinchy Stryder's album track "Game Over", which also featuring Example, Tinie Tempah, Giggs, Devlin and Chipmunk debuted at number twenty-two in the UK. In June 2011, Green also appeared alongside collaborator Maverick Sabre on project True Tiger's single "In the Air"; which peaked at number fifty-two.

Albums

Studio albums

Mixtapes

Extended plays

Singles

As lead artist

As featured artist

Promotional singles

Guest appearances

Music videos
As lead artist

References

External links
 Professor Green official website
 Biography – Professor Green

Discographies of British artists
Hip hop discographies